Bradley Littleton Babcock (March 10, 1939 – June 2, 2020) was an American college baseball coach, the head coach of James Madison (JMU) from 1971 to 1989. Under him, the Dukes appeared in five NCAA Tournaments (four in Division I) and the 1983 College World Series. His overall record in 19 seasons was 555–251–4, including a home record of 339–71–1.

Coaching career
After graduating from Lynchburg College in 1963, Babcock worked as a high school baseball coach in Colorado, New Hampshire, and Vermont.

James Madison started its baseball program in 1970, shortly after it became co-educational. Babcock took over in 1971, its second season. It started out as an NCAA Division II program but joined Division I for the 1977 season.

In addition to being JMU's baseball coach, Babcock held several other positions in the early 1970s. At the university, he was an assistant football coach, junior varsity basketball coach, physical education instructor, and intramural director. He also served as the head coach of the Valley League's Harrisonburg Turks for several summers.

In 1983, the Dukes became the first Virginia school to make the College World Series (CWS). The Dukes opened the season with an exhibition game against the St. Louis Cardinals. After losing in the ECAC Tournament, many players returned home, thinking the season was over, but the team was given an at-large bid to the NCAA Tournament.  JMU went 4–0 in the East Regional to reach the CWS, where it lost games to Texas and Stanford in Omaha.

Head coaching record
Below is a table of Babcock's yearly records as a collegiate head baseball coach.

Administrative career
After stepping down from the baseball coach position following the 1989 season, Babcock worked in JMU's athletic department. He was added to the department's Hall of Fame in 1998. He retired as executive association athletic director in 2003.

Personal
Babcock's son Whit is the athletic director at Virginia Tech; he previously held the same position at Cincinnati. Whit was the batboy on the 1983 College World Series team and played for Babcock in 1989, his final season as JMU's head coach. Babcock died on June 2, 2020 at the age of 81.

Notes

References

1939 births
2020 deaths
Baseball coaches from Virginia
Baseball players from Virginia
Baseball shortstops
High school baseball coaches in the United States
James Madison Dukes baseball coaches
James Madison Dukes football coaches
Lynchburg Hornets baseball players